Akulov (masculine) or Akulova (feminine) is a Russian surname. It originates either from the old-Russian nickname Okul/Akul (meaning crook, deceiver) or from the Greek given name Aquila (Ἀκύλας). Notable people with the surname include:
Dinara Akulova (born 1964), Kyrgyz singer
Igor Akulov (1897–1937), Russian Orthodox monk and Eastern Catholic priest
Ivan Akulov (1888–1937), Soviet politician 
Marina Akulova (born 1985), Russian volleyball player
Varya Akulova (born 1992), Ukrainian strongwoman
Yevgeny Akulov (1905–1996), Soviet conductor

See also
Okulov

References

Russian-language surnames